In set theory, a semiset is a proper class that is a subclass of a set.
The theory of semisets was proposed and developed by Czech mathematicians Petr Vopěnka and Petr Hájek (1972). It is based on a modification of the von Neumann–Bernays–Gödel set theory; in standard NBG, the existence of semisets is precluded by the axiom of separation.

The concept of semisets opens the way for a formulation of an alternative set theory.
In particular, Vopěnka's Alternative Set Theory (1979) axiomatizes the concept of semiset, supplemented with several additional principles.

Semisets can be used to represent sets with imprecise boundaries. Novák (1984) studied approximation of semisets by fuzzy sets, which are often more suitable for practical applications of the modeling of imprecision.

References

Vopěnka, P., and Hájek, P. The Theory of Semisets. Amsterdam: North-Holland, 1972.
Vopěnka, P. Mathematics in the Alternative Set Theory. Teubner, Leipzig, 1979.
Holmes, M.R.  Alternative Axiomatic Set Theories, §9.2, Vopenka's alternative set theory. In E. N. Zalta (ed.): The Stanford Encyclopedia of Philosophy (Fall 2014 Edition).
Novák, V. "Fuzzy sets—the approximation of semisets." Fuzzy Sets and Systems 14 (1984): 259–272.

Systems of set theory